The fall of Kismayo occurred on January 1, 2007, when the troops of Somalia's Transitional Federal Government (TFG) and Ethiopian forces entered the Somali city of Kismayo unopposed. It came after the Islamic Courts Union's forces faltered and fled in the Battle of Jilib, abandoning their final stronghold.

Background 
The city of Kismayo had been the capital of the autonomous state of Jubaland under the administration of the Juba Valley Alliance (JVA) since the late 1990s. The JVA suffered the loss of Kismayo in September 2006 to an array of ICU forces with 130 technicals.

Course of events
In December 2006, after the Fall of Mogadishu, much of the  Islamists began a retreat towards Kismayo. According to the New York Times, when the Battle of Jilib began on December 31, 2006, clan elders within Kismayo demanded the ICU leave the city. Mohammed Arab, a clan leader said "We told them that they were going to lose, and that our city would get destroyed." After the ICU refused, sporadic gun battles broke out between the local clans and the ICU.

The Battle of Jilib saw the ICU frontlines collapse during the night to artillery fire, causing the ICU hardliners, known as Al-Shabaab (literally "The Youths" or "Young Men"), to once again go into retreat, this time towards the Kenyan border. TFG and Ethiopian forces entered the town on January 1, 2007.

With the Kenyan border blocked, the ICU remnants were described as holding up in Badhadhe district, either in the hills of the Buur Gaabo area, or in the village of Ras Kamboni along the coast near the border.

Aftermath 
In August 2008, Al Shabaab retook the city during the Battle of Kismayo (2008).

In September 2012, the Somali National Army assisted by AMISOM troops and Raskamboni militia re-captured Kismayo from the insurgents in the Battle of Kismayo (2012).

References

Further reading
 Stig Jarle Hansen, Al-Shabaab in Somalia: The History and Ideology of a Militant Islamic Group 2005-12, Hurst & Co., 2013, 39-40.

2007 in Ethiopia
2007 in Somalia
Kismayo
Kismayo
Kismayo
Kismayo
January 2007 events in Africa